Šváb is a Czechized German surname. Notable people with the surname include:
 Antonín Šváb Sr. (1932–2014), Czechoslovakian speedway rider
 Antonín Šváb Jr. (1974), Czech speedway rider
 Dániel Sváb (1990), Hungarian football player
 Filip Šváb (1983), Czech poet
 Gašper Švab (1986), Slovenian former cyclist
 Josef Šváb (1933), Czech former sports shooter
 Josef Šváb-Malostranský (1860–1932), Czech actor, writer, cabaret singer, publisher, director and screenwriter
 Oldrich Svab (1944–2020), Czech-Swiss football coach

See also 
 Dunai-Sváb
 Schwab

Czech-language surnames
Ethnonymic surnames